"I Can't Hate You Anymore" is a song by American singer-songwriter Nick Lachey, released as the second single from his second solo album, What's Left of Me, on October 30, 2006.

Music video

The video for "I Can't Hate You Anymore" was filmed on June 27, 2006, on a beach in Malibu, California. This date was only a few days before Lachey's divorce from singer-actress Jessica Simpson became final, and coupled with the rainy atmosphere that appears in the video adds further poignancy to the melancholy lyrics of the song. The video premiered on MTV's Total Request Live on July 26, 2006, and debuted on the TRL Countdown Chart at number nine on July 27, 2006.

The music video utilizes a slightly different mixed track from the album version. Noticeable differences in this unnamed mix are the rising of the guitar and vocal echoes during the second verse. For example, the line "you're not the person that you used to be", "used to be" echoes in a following blended effect (not found on the original album release nor UK CD single). This version can only be found in the music video.

Track listings
European CD single
 "I Can't Hate You Anymore"
 "Did I Ever Tell You"

Australian CD single
 "I Can't Hate You Anymore" – 3:52
 "Did I Ever Tell You" – 3:53
 "Because I Told You So" – 3:45

Charts

References

2006 singles
Jive Records singles
Music videos directed by Ray Kay
Nick Lachey songs
Songs about heartache
Songs written by Jess Cates
Songs written by Lindy Robbins
Songs written by Nick Lachey
Songs written by Rob Wells